The JAPW Light Heavyweight Championship is a championship in the Jersey All Pro Wrestling promotion in the United States.It became official title on December 5, 1997 when Rik Rachet defeated Chino Martinez in a tournament final to crown the first champion. It was retired on September 15, 2006 when the New Jersey State Championship was re-activated. Frankie Kazarian remained champion as a result. Prince Mustafa Ali became the new champion after the title was re-activated. 
There have been 28 reigns by 23 wrestlers with eight vacancies.

Title history

Combined reigns

Footnotes

References

External links
JAPW Light Heavyweight title history
Solie.org JAPW Light Heavyweight title history
 JAPW Light Heavyweight Championship

Light heavyweight wrestling championships
Light